Luther Hansen Lincoln (November 20, 1914 – June 27, 1980) was a Republican politician from California who served in the California State Assembly from January 3, 1949, to January 5, 1959, representing part of Alameda County. He served as Speaker of the Assembly from 1955 to 1958.

References

1914 births
1980 deaths
Speakers of the California State Assembly
Republican Party members of the California State Assembly
People from Alameda County, California
20th-century American politicians